Puebla de Guzmán is a town and a municipality located in the province of Huelva, Spain. According to the 2005 census, it has a population of 3,109 inhabitants.

Notable people
Pablo Oliveira, footballer

References

External links
Puebla de Guzmán - Sistema de Información Multiterritorial de Andalucía

Municipalities in the Province of Huelva